William Gregg may refer to:

William Gregg (VC) (1890–1969), British First World War Victoria Cross recipient
William Gregg (industrialist) (1800–1867), founder of the pioneer Graniteville, South Carolina textile mill
William Gregg (tennis), Australian tennis player in 1907 Australasian Championships
William Gregg (New Zealand businessman), founder of the New Zealand company Gregg's
William Gregg (clerk and spy) (died 1708), Scottish clerk and spy
Bill Gregg (1914–2000), Australian rules footballer 
William O. Gregg, American bishop
William Gregg (theologian) (1817–1909), Canadian theologian and clergyman; Professor of Apologetics

See also
William Greg (1809-1881), English essayist
William Greig (disambiguation)